Genipa americana is a species of trees in the family Rubiaceae. It is native to the tropical forests of North and South America, as well as the Caribbean.

Description
Genipa americana trees are up to 30 m tall and up to 60 cm dbh. Their bark is smooth with little fissures. The leaves are opposite, obovate, or obovate oblong, 10–35 cm long, 6–13 cm wide, and glossy dark green, with entire margin, acute or acuminate apex, and attenuated base. The inflorescences are cymes up to 10 cm long. The flowers are white to yellowish, slightly fragrant, calyx bell-shaped, corolla at 2–4.5 cm long, trumpet-shaped, and five- or six-lobed. The five short stamens are inserted on top of the corolla tube. The fruit is a thick-skinned edible greyish berry 10–12 cm long, 5–9 cm in diameter.

Distribution and habitat
Genipa americana is native to the tropical forests of the Americas, from tropical Florida south to Argentina. It is present from sea level up to 1200 m of elevation, although some argue the original native range as being northern South America.

Vernacular names
In English, the tree is known as the genip tree  and the fruit as genipap .

Colombia: jagua, caruto, huito; Brazil: jenipapo, formerly genipapo; Costa Rica: guaitil, tapaculo; Nicaragua: tapaculo, yigualtí; Mexico: shagua, xagua, maluco; Perú: huito, vito, jagua; Argentina: ñandipá; Bolivia: bí

Its name has been reconstructed as we'e (*weʔe) in Proto-Tucanoan.

Chemical compounds
The following compounds have been isolated from G. americana: genipic acid, genipinic acid, genipin (all three from the fruit) and geniposidic acid (leaves).

Uses
The unripe fruit of G. americana yields a liquid used as a dye for tattoos, skin painting and insect repellent.

This species is also cultivated for its edible fruits, which are eaten in preserves or made into drinks, jelly, or ice cream.

The wood is reported to be resistant, strong, and easily worked; it is used in the making of utensils and in construction and carpentry.

Gallery

See also
Jagua tattoo

References

Gardenieae
Trees of South America
Trees of North America
Trees of the Caribbean
Plants described in 1759
Taxa named by Carl Linnaeus
Flora without expected TNC conservation status